Kanat Aldabergenuly Bozumbayev (Qanat Aldabergenūly Bozymbaev) has been the minister of energy since 25 March 2016.

Early career
Bozumbayev was born on 8 January 1969.

He graduated from Kazakh State Academy of Management in Narxoz University in 1993. From September to November 1997, he is the head of the department of regional policy in the Ministry of Economy and Trade. From September 1998 to February 2001, he served as the director of the department of oil and gas and vice minister in the Ministry of Energy, Industry and Trade.

He previously served as the governor of Pavlodar Region prior to his appointment as Energy Minister.

From December 18, 2019 to November 24, 2021 — Assistant to the President of the Republic of Kazakhstan.

From November 24 , 2021 to June 10 , 2022 — held the post of Akim of Almaty region.

References

1969 births
Living people
Ministers of Energy (Kazakhstan)
Narxoz University alumni